Pamela Ann Barker (née Addison, born 1957) is a United States district judge of the United States District Court for the Northern District of Ohio. She formerly served as a Judge of the Cuyahoga County Court of Common Pleas.

Early life and education 

Barker was born in 1957 in Cleveland, Ohio. She earned her Bachelor of Arts, magna cum laude, from Kenyon College, where she was inducted into Phi Beta Kappa, and her Juris Doctor from the Ohio State University Moritz College of Law.

Legal career 

Prior to ascending to the bench, Barker spent twenty-nine years representing individuals, small businesses, and corporations, with a particular emphasis on insurance litigation. From 2000 to 2011, she served as a Mayor's Court Magistrate and Juvenile Diversion Magistrate for the City of Brecksville, Ohio.

She was appointed to the Cuyahoga County Court of Common Pleas by Governor John Kasich and assumed office on September 19, 2011. Barker was elected to the court in November 2012. Her state court service ended on June 18, 2019, upon her elevation to the federal bench.

Federal judicial service 

On September 29, 2017, Ohio Senators Sherrod Brown and Rob Portman recommended Barker for a federal judgeship. On April 10, 2018, President Donald Trump announced his intent to nominate Barker to serve as a United States District Judge of the United States District Court for the Northern District of Ohio. On April 12, 2018, her nomination was sent to the Senate. She was nominated to the seat vacated by Judge Donald C. Nugent, who assumed senior status on January 1, 2017. On October 10, 2018, a hearing on her nomination was held before the Senate Judiciary Committee.

On January 3, 2019, her nomination was returned to the President under Rule XXXI, Paragraph 6 of the Senate. On January 23, 2019, President Trump announced his intent to renominate Barker for a federal judgeship. Her nomination was sent to the Senate later that day. On February 7, 2019, her nomination was reported out of committee by a voice vote. On June 11, 2019, the Senate voted 89–7 to invoke cloture on her nomination. On June 12, 2019, her nomination was confirmed by a 91–5 vote. She received her judicial commission on June 18, 2019.

Personal life 

Her parents are William D. Addison and Peggy Ann Addison. She is married to Jeffery L. Barker, with whom she has two sons.

References

External links 
 
 "Judge Pamela A. Barker" profile at Cuyahoga County Common Pleas Court
 

|-

1957 births
Living people
20th-century American lawyers
21st-century American lawyers
21st-century American judges
Judges of the United States District Court for the Northern District of Ohio
Kenyon College alumni
Lawyers from Cleveland
Ohio lawyers
Ohio Republicans
Ohio state court judges
Ohio State University Moritz College of Law alumni
People from Brecksville, Ohio
United States district court judges appointed by Donald Trump
Cleveland State University faculty
20th-century American women lawyers
21st-century American women lawyers
21st-century American women judges